The four-striped grass mouse (Rhabdomys pumilio) or four-striped grass rat, is a species of rodent in the family Muridae.

Its natural habitats are savannas, shrublands, Mediterranean-type shrubby vegetation, hot deserts, arable land, rural gardens, and urban areas.

References

mouse, grass, four-striped
Mammals of Southern Africa
four-striped grass mouse
Taxonomy articles created by Polbot
Taxa named by Anders Sparrman